Club Calleja is a football club from Santa Cruz, Bolivia currently playing at Santa Cruz Primera A, one of the first division regional leagues. The club is the senior team of Tahuichi.
They play their home games at the Estadio Ramón Tahuichi Aguilera. Calleja has  never competed in the Liga de Fútbol Profesional Boliviano.

References
  Calleja Cae (in Spanish)
 Calleja (in Spanish)

Football clubs in Bolivia